Marras may refer to:

 Andreia Marras, Brazilian volleyball player
 Antonio Marras, Italian fashion designer
 Giacinto Marras, Italian opera singer 
 Giorgio Marras, Italian sprinter 
 Leonardo Marras, Italian politician
 Luigi Efisio Marras, Italian general 
 Manuel Marras, Italian footballer 
 Marras (album), 2012 album by Harmaja